B2K Is Hot! Boys of the Millennium is a compilation album by B2K released on June 6, 2006 by SonyBMG Special Markets. It features a few of their hits and songs from You Got Served soundtrack.

Track listing
"B2K Is Hot"
"Bump, Bump, Bump" (featuring P. Diddy)
"Why I Love You"
"Girlfriend"
"Bump That"
"Come On"
"Your Girl Chose Me"
"You Can Get It"
"Pretty Young Thing"
"Take It to the Floor"
"Uh Huh"

References

B2K albums
2006 compilation albums